Sun Yat Sen Park may refer to:

Sun Yat Sen Park, Macau, park in Macau
 Sun Yat-sen Park (Montreal)
Sun Yat Sen Memorial Park, park in Hong Kong
Sun Yat-sen Playlot Park, park in Chinatown, Chicago
Zhongshan Park, parks in honour of Sun Yat Sen in China
Dr. Sun Yat-Sen Classical Chinese Garden in Vancouver, Canada
Sun Yat-sen Memorial Hall with attached Memorial Park, Taipei